Saidū Sharīf is the capital of Swat District in the Khyber Pakhtunkhwa province of Pakistan. The city also serves as the capital city of Malakand Division. It was named after Saidu Baba, a prominent leader of the former Yusufzai State of Swat.

Saidu Sharif is the hub of several official buildings, and archeological sites such as the Swat Museum, the Tomb of Saidu Baba, Royal Residential Palace of former Wali-e-Swat, and the archaeological remains of the Butkara Buddhist Stupa. It is also home to the Govt. Girls Degree College, Govt. Jahanzeb college, DIG, DC, and the Commissioner House.

Old name of the city
Since the ancient Buddhist era, the name of Saidu Sharif was "Baligram". Akhund Abdul Ghaffur, commonly known as Saidu Baba, settled here in 1835. From then onwards, the town was called "Saidu Sharif". However, there is still a calm region in the southwest of Saidu Sharif which is called 'Baligram'

Climate

Saidu Sharif has a hot-summer Mediterranean climate (Csa) under the Köppen climate classification. The average annual temperature in Saidu Sharif is 19.3 °C, while the annual precipitation averages 894 mm. November is the driest month with 22 mm of precipitation, while August, the wettest month, has an average precipitation of 134 mm.

June is the hottest month of the year with an average temperature of 29.2 °C. The coldest month January has an average temperature of 7.5 °C.

Swat Museum of Saidu Sharif

The Swat museum is on the east side of the G.T road, halfway between Mingora and Saidu Sharif. Japanese aid has given a facelift to its seven galleries which now contain an excellent collection of Gandhara sculptures taken from some of the Buddhist sites in Swat. The galleries have been rearranged and labeled to illustrate the Buddha's life story.

Terracotta figurines and utensils, beads, precious stones, coins, weapons and various metal objects are present from ancient Gandhara. The ethnographic section displays the finest examples of local embroidery, carved wood, and tribal jewelry. It is also under renovation with funds from the Pakistani-Italian debt swap agreement.

Education
The pioneer alma mater of education & learning Govt: Wadudia High School is located in Saidu Sharif which has blessed thousands of students with the light of knowledge. Similarly, the largest college (P.G Jahanzeb college) of the district was built here in 1952 and offers MSc (to males and females), BSc and Fsc degrees (male only). Saidu medical college was built here in 1998; which ranks third in the government medical colleges in the province. On 7 July 2010, the first university of the district was established in this area.

Since the rule of the Mian family in Saidu Sharif, Swat has set the excellent ground for education and infrastructure improving its image as a well preserve touristic site.

In the last few years, Swat has seen great changes in all aspects of its society including an increase in education, modern health care centers and a new university, along with private sector colleges.

Archeological sites

One of the most important Buddhist relics in Swat is near the museum. The stupa, which dates from the 2nd century BC, was possibly built by the Mauryan emperor Ashoka to house some of the ashes of the Buddha. In subsequent centuries, it was enlarged five times by encasing the existing structure in a new shell.

Italian excavators working in 1955, exposed the successive layers of the stupa, each layer illustrating a stage in the evolution of building techniques.

Administrative divisions
Saidu Sharif is an administrative unit, known as Union council or Ward in Tehsil Babuzai, of Swat District in the Khyber Pakhtunkhwa province of Pakistan.

According to Khyber Pakhtunkhwa Local Government Act 2013. District Swat has 67 Wards, of which total amount of Village Councils is 170, and Neighbourhood Councils is 44.

Saidu Sharif is Territorial Ward, which is further divided into three Neighbourhood Councils:
 Saidu Sharif i (Neighbourhood Council)
 Saidu Sharif ii (Neighbourhood Council)
 Saidu Sharif iii (Neighbourhood Council)

See also 
 Swat District
 Babuzai
 Hidden Treasures of Swat, Book on Saidu Sharif Heritage

References 

http://www.saidusharif.com

https://archive.today/20130915044603/http://education.yahoo.com/reference/encyclopedia/entry/Swat

Populated places in Swat District
Cities in Khyber Pakhtunkhwa